The Criminal Justice Act (Northern Ireland) 1945 (c. 15) is an Act of the Parliament of Northern Ireland.

Section 25 of the Act creates the offence of child destruction, which states:

This section provides a defence of acting in good faith to preserve the life of the mother. The offence supplemented the offence of abortion (under the Offences against the Person Act 1861), which deals with unborn children not capable of being born alive. The Offences against the Person Act 1861 was repealed for Northern Ireland in October 2019.

Other provisions of the Act deal with miscellaneous criminal procedure, search warrants pertaining to brothels, marital coercion, and a prohibition on the taking of photographs in court.

References

United Kingdom abortion law
Acts of the Parliament of Northern Ireland 1945
Criminal law of Northern Ireland